Hans Mühlethaler (July 9, 1930 – September 17, 2016) was a Swiss writer.

Mühlethaler was teacher in the Emmental and in the city of Bern, later a freelance writer and secretary of the Gruppe Olten. His play An der Grenze (theatre of the absurd) was premiered in 1963 at the Schauspielhaus Zurich under the direction of Karl Suter and published by Hans Rudolf Hilty in his literary magazine Hortulus. For his poems Zutreffendes ankreuzen he was awarded the Literature Prize of the Canton of Bern in 1968. He has written novels and nonfiction and is a member of the Association of Authors of Switzerland. He lived in Bern, was married and has five children. Mühlethaler died on September 17, 2016, aged 86.

References

External links 
 
 
 Hans Mühlethaler in the Online Encyclopedia of Bernese Writers, University of Bern
 hansmuehlethaler.com

Swiss dramatists and playwrights
Swiss writers
1930 births
2016 deaths
Swiss male writers
People from Emmental District
Writers from Bern
20th-century male writers
21st-century male writers
20th-century dramatists and playwrights
21st-century dramatists and playwrights
20th-century Swiss writers
21st-century Swiss writers